

Events

Pre-1600
37 – Roman Senate annuls Tiberius' will and proclaims Gaius Julius Caesar Augustus Germanicus (aka Caligula = Little Boots) emperor. 
1068 – An earthquake in the Levant and the Arabian Peninsula leaves up to 20,000 dead.
1229 – Frederick II, Holy Roman Emperor, declares himself King of Jerusalem in the Sixth Crusade.
1241 – First Mongol invasion of Poland: Mongols overwhelm Polish armies in Kraków in the Battle of Chmielnik and plunder the city.
1314 – Jacques de Molay, the 23rd and final Grand Master of the Knights Templar, is burned at the stake.
1438 – Albert II of Habsburg becomes King of the Romans.
1571 – Valletta is made the capital city of Malta.

1601–1900
1608 – Susenyos is formally crowned Emperor of Ethiopia.
1644 – The Third Anglo-Powhatan War begins in the Colony of Virginia.
1673 – English lord John Berkeley sold his half of New Jersey to the Quakers
1741 – New York governor George Clarke's complex at Fort George is burned in an arson attack, starting the New York Conspiracy of 1741.
1766 – American Revolution: The British Parliament repeals the Stamp Act.
1793 – The first modern republic in Germany, the Republic of Mainz, is declared by Andreas Joseph Hofmann.
1793 – Flanders Campaign of the French Revolution, Battle of Neerwinden.
1834 – Six farm labourers from Tolpuddle, Dorset, England are sentenced to be transported to Australia for forming a trade union.
1848 – The premiere of Fry's Leonora in Philadelphia is the first known performance of an grand opera by an American composer.
1865 – American Civil War: The Congress of the Confederate States adjourns for the last time.
1871 – Declaration of the Paris Commune; President of the French Republic, Adolphe Thiers, orders the evacuation of Paris.
1874 – The Hawaiian Kingdom signs a treaty with the United States granting exclusive trade rights.
1899 – Phoebe, a satellite of Saturn, becomes the first to be discovered with photographs, taken in August 1898, by William Henry Pickering.

1901–present
1902 – Macario Sakay issues Presidential Order No. 1 of his Tagalog Republic.
1913 – King George I of Greece is assassinated in the recently liberated city of Thessaloniki.
1915 – World War I: During the Battle of Gallipoli, three battleships are sunk during a failed British and French naval attack on the Dardanelles.
1921 – The second Peace of Riga is signed between Poland and the Soviet Union.
  1921   – The Kronstadt rebellion is suppressed by the Red Army.
1922 – In India, Mohandas Gandhi is sentenced to six years in prison for civil disobedience, of which he serves only two.
1925 – The Tri-State Tornado hits the Midwestern states of Missouri, Illinois, and Indiana, killing 695 people.
1937 – The New London School explosion in New London, Texas, kills 300 people, mostly children.
  1937   – Spanish Civil War: Spanish Republican forces defeat the Italians at the Battle of Guadalajara.
1938 – Mexico creates Pemex by expropriating all foreign-owned oil reserves and facilities.
1940 – World War II: Adolf Hitler and Benito Mussolini meet at the Brenner Pass in the Alps and agree to form an alliance against France and the United Kingdom.
1942 – The War Relocation Authority is established in the United States to take Japanese Americans into custody.
1944 – Mount Vesuvius in Italy erupts, killing 26 people, causing thousands to flee their homes, and destroying dozens of Allied bombers.
1948 – Soviet consultants leave Yugoslavia in the first sign of the Tito–Stalin Split.
1953 – An earthquake hits western Turkey, killing at least 1,070 people.
1959 – The Hawaii Admission Act is signed into law.
1962 – The Évian Accords end the Algerian War of Independence, which had begun in 1954.
1965 – Cosmonaut Alexei Leonov, leaving his spacecraft Voskhod 2 for 12 minutes, becomes the first person to walk in space.
1966 – United Arab Airlines Flight 749 crashes on approach to Cairo International Airport in Cairo, Egypt, killing 30 people.
1967 – The supertanker  runs aground off the Cornish coast.
1968 – Gold standard: The U.S. Congress repeals the requirement for a gold reserve to back US currency.
1969 – The United States begins secretly bombing the Sihanouk Trail in Cambodia, used by communist forces to infiltrate South Vietnam.
1970 – Lon Nol ousts Prince Norodom Sihanouk of Cambodia.
1971 – Peru: A landslide crashes into Yanawayin Lake, killing 200 people at the mining camp of Chungar.
1974 – Güzel İstanbul, a nude sculpture by Gürdal Duyar in Istanbul is torn down in the middle of the night
1980 – A Vostok-2M rocket at Plesetsk Cosmodrome Site 43 explodes during a fueling operation, killing 48 people.
1990 – Germans in the German Democratic Republic vote in the first democratic elections in the former communist dictatorship.
  1990   – In the largest art theft in US history, 12 paintings, collectively worth around $500 million, are stolen from the Isabella Stewart Gardner Museum in Boston.
1994 – Bosnia's Bosniaks and Croats sign the Washington Agreement, ending war between the Croatian Republic of Herzeg-Bosnia and the Republic of Bosnia and Herzegovina, and establishing the Federation of Bosnia and Herzegovina.
1996 – A nightclub fire in Quezon City, Philippines kills 162 people.
1997 – The tail of a Russian Antonov An-24 charter plane breaks off while en route to Turkey, causing the plane to crash and killing all 50 people on board.
2014 – The parliaments of Russia and Crimea sign an accession treaty.
2015 – The Bardo National Museum in Tunisia is attacked by gunmen. Twenty-three people, almost all tourists, are killed, and at least 50 other people are wounded.

Births

Pre-1600
1075 – Al-Zamakhshari, Persian scholar and theologian (d. 1144)
1395 – John Holland, 2nd Duke of Exeter, English military commander (d. 1447)
1495 – Mary Tudor, Queen of France (d. 1533)
1548 – Cornelis Ketel, Dutch painter (d. 1616)
1552 – Polykarp Leyser the Elder, German theologian (d. 1610)
1554 – Josias I, Count of Waldeck-Eisenberg, Count of Waldeck-Eisenberg (d. 1588)
1555 – Francis, Duke of Anjou (d. 1584)
1578 – Adam Elsheimer, German painter (d. 1610)
1590 – Manuel de Faria e Sousa, Portuguese historian and poet (d. 1649)
1597 – Jérôme le Royer de la Dauversière, French religious leader, founded the Société Notre-Dame de Montréal (d. 1659)

1601–1900
1603 – Simon Bradstreet, English colonial magistrate (d. 1697)
1609 – Frederick III of Denmark (d. 1670)
1634 – Madame de La Fayette, French author (d. 1693)
1640 – Philippe de La Hire, French mathematician and astronomer (d. 1719)
1657 – Giuseppe Ottavio Pitoni, Italian organist and composer (d. 1743)
1690 – Christian Goldbach, Prussian-German mathematician and academic (d. 1764)
1701 – Niclas Sahlgren, Swedish businessman and philanthropist, co-founded the Swedish East India Company (d. 1776)
1733 – Christoph Friedrich Nicolai, German author and bookseller (d. 1811)
1780 – Miloš Obrenović, Serbian prince (d. 1860)
1782 – John C. Calhoun, American lawyer and politician, 7th Vice President of the United States (d. 1850)
1789 – Charlotte Elliott, English poet, hymn writer, editor (d. 1871)
1798 – Francis Lieber, German-American jurist and philosopher (d. 1872)
1800 – Harriet Smithson, Irish actress, the first wife and muse of Hector Berlioz (d. 1854)
1813 – Christian Friedrich Hebbel, German poet and playwright (d. 1864)
1814 – Jacob Bunn, American businessman (d. 1897)
1819 – James McCulloch, Scottish-Australian politician, 5th Premier of Victoria (d. 1893)
1820 – John Plankinton, American businessman, industrialist, and philanthropist (d. 1891)
1823 – Antoine Chanzy, French general (d. 1883)
1828 – Randal Cremer, English activist and politician, Nobel Prize laureate (d. 1908)
1837 – Grover Cleveland, American lawyer and politician, 22nd and 24th President of the United States (d. 1908)
1840 – William Cosmo Monkhouse, English poet and critic (d. 1901)
1842 – Stéphane Mallarmé, French poet and critic (d. 1898)
1844 – Nikolai Rimsky-Korsakov, Russian composer and academic (d. 1908)
1845 – Kicking Bear, Native American tribal leader (d. 1904)
1848 – Nathanael Greene Herreshoff, American architect and engineer (d. 1938)
1858 – Rudolf Diesel, German engineer, invented the Diesel engine (d. 1913)
1862 – Eugène Jansson, Swedish painter (d. 1915)
1863 – William Sulzer, American lawyer and politician, 39th Governor of New York (d. 1941)
1869 – Neville Chamberlain, English businessman and politician, Prime Minister of the United Kingdom (d. 1940)
1870 – Agnes Sime Baxter, Canadian mathematician (d. 1917)
1874 – Nikolai Berdyaev, Russian-French philosopher and theologian (d. 1948)
1877 – Edgar Cayce, American mystic and psychic (d. 1945)
  1877   – Clem Hill, Australian cricketer and engineer (d. 1945)
1878 – Percival Perry, 1st Baron Perry, English businessman (d. 1956)
1882 – Gian Francesco Malipiero, Italian composer and educator (d. 1973)
1884 – Bernard Cronin, English-Australian journalist and author (d. 1968)
1886 – Edward Everett Horton, American actor, singer, and dancer (d. 1970)
1890 – Henri Decoin, French director and screenwriter (d. 1969)
1893 – Costante Girardengo, Italian cyclist (d. 1978)
  1893   – Wilfred Owen, English soldier and poet (d. 1918)

1901–present
1901 – Manly Palmer Hall, Canadian mystic, author and philosopher (d. 1990)
  1901   – William Johnson, American painter (d. 1970)
1903 – Galeazzo Ciano, Italian journalist and politician, Italian Minister of Foreign Affairs (d. 1944)
  1903   – E. O. Plauen, German cartoonist (d. 1944)
1904 – Srečko Kosovel, Slovenian poet and author (d. 1926)
1905 – Thomas Townsend Brown, American physicist and engineer (d. 1985)
  1905   – Robert Donat, English actor (d. 1958)
1907 – John Zachary Young, English zoologist and neurophysiologist (d. 1997)
1908 – Loulou Gasté, French composer (d. 1995)
1909 – Ernest Gallo, American businessman, co-founded the E & J Gallo Winery (d. 2007)
  1909   – C. Walter Hodges, English author and illustrator (d. 2004)
1911 – Smiley Burnette, American singer-songwriter and actor (d. 1967)
1912 – Art Gilmore, American voice actor and announcer (d. 2010)
1913 – René Clément, French director and screenwriter (d. 1996)
  1913   – Werner Mölders, German colonel and pilot (d. 1941)
1915 – Richard Condon, American author and screenwriter (d. 1996)
1922 – Egon Bahr, German journalist and politician, Federal Minister for Special Affairs of Germany (d. 2015)
  1922   – Seymour Martin Lipset, American sociologist and academic (d. 2006)
  1922   – Suzanne Perlman, Hungarian-Dutch visual artist (d. 2020)
  1922   – Fred Shuttlesworth, American activist, co-founded the Southern Christian Leadership Conference (d. 2011)
1923 – Andy Granatelli, American race car driver and businessman (d. 2013)
1925 – Alessandro Alessandroni, Italian musician (d. 2017)
  1925   – James Pickles, English journalist, lawyer, and judge (d. 2010)
1926 – Peter Graves, American actor and director (d. 2010)
1927 – John Kander, American pianist and composer
  1927   – George Plimpton, American journalist and actor (d. 2003)
  1927   – Lillian Vernon, German-American businesswoman and philanthropist, founded the Lillian Vernon Company (d. 2015)
1928 – Miguel Poblet, Spanish cyclist (d. 2013)
  1928   – Fidel V. Ramos, Filipino general and politician, 12th President of the Philippines (d. 2022)
1929 – Samuel Pisar, Polish-American lawyer and author (d. 2015)
1930 – James J. Andrews, American mathematician and academic (d. 1998)
1931 – John Fraser, Scottish actor (d. 2020)
1932 – John Updike, American novelist, short story writer, and critic (d. 2009)
1933 – Unita Blackwell, American civil rights activist and politician (d. 2019)
1934 – Roy Chapman, English footballer and manager (d. 1983)
  1934   – Charley Pride, American country music singer and musician (d. 2020)
1935 – Ole Barndorff-Nielsen, Danish mathematician and statistician
  1935   – Frances Cress Welsing, American psychiatrist and author (d. 2016)
1936 – F. W. de Klerk, South African lawyer and politician, former State President of South Africa, Nobel Prize laureate (d. 2021)
1937 – Rudi Altig, German cyclist and sportscaster (d. 2016)
  1937   – Mark Donohue, American race car driver (d. 1975)
1938 – Carl Gottlieb, American actor and screenwriter
  1938   – Shashi Kapoor, Indian actor and producer (d. 2017)
  1938   – Kenny Lynch, English singer-songwriter and actor (d. 2019)
  1938   – Timo Mäkinen, Finnish race car driver (d. 2017)
  1938   – Machiko Soga, Japanese actress (d. 2006)
1939 – Ron Atkinson, English footballer and manager
  1939   – Jean-Pierre Wallez, French violinist and conductor
1941 – Wilson Pickett, American singer-songwriter (d. 2006)
1942 – Kathleen Collins, African-American filmmaker and playwright (d. 1988)
1943 – Dennis Linde, American singer-songwriter (d. 2006)
1944 – Amnon Lipkin-Shahak, Israeli general and politician, 22nd Transportation Minister of Israel (d. 2012)
  1944   – Frank McRae, American football player and actor (d. 2021)
  1944   – Dick Smith, Australian publisher and businessman, founded Dick Smith Electronics and Australian Geographic
1945 – Hiroh Kikai, Japanese photographer (d. 2020)
  1945   – Michael Reagan, American journalist and radio host
  1945   – Susan Tyrrell, American actress (d. 2012)
  1945   – Eric Woolfson, Scottish singer-songwriter, pianist, and producer (d. 2009)
1946 – Michel Leclère, French race car driver
1947 – Patrick Barlow, English actor and playwright
  1947   – Patrick Chesnais, French actor, director, and screenwriter
  1947   – David Lloyd, English cricketer, journalist, and sportscaster
  1947   – B. J. Wilson, English rock drummer (d. 1990)
1948 – Guy Lapointe, Canadian ice hockey player and coach
  1948   – Brian Lloyd, Welsh footballer
  1948   – Eknath Solkar, Indian cricketer (d. 2005)
1949 – Åse Kleveland, Norwegian singer and politician, Norwegian Minister of Culture
1950 – James Conlon, American conductor and educator
  1950   – Brad Dourif, American actor
  1950   – Linda Partridge, English geneticist and academic
  1950   – Larry Perkins, Australian race car driver
1951 – Paul Barber, English actor
  1951   – Ben Cohen, American businessman and philanthropist, co-founded Ben and Jerry's
  1951   – Bill Frisell, American guitarist and composer
  1951   – Timothy N. Philpot, American lawyer, author, and judge
1952 – Will Durst, American journalist and actor
  1952   – Pat Eddery, Irish jockey and trainer (d. 2015)
  1952   – Bernie Tormé, Irish singer-songwriter and guitarist (d. 2019)
  1952   – Mike Webster, American football player (d. 2002)
1953 – Franz Wright, Austrian-American poet and translator (d. 2015)
  1953   – Takashi Yoshimatsu, Japanese composer
1955 – Francis G. Slay, American lawyer and politician, 45th Mayor of St. Louis
  1955   – Jeff Stelling, English journalist and game show host
1956 – Rick Martel, Canadian wrestler
  1956   – Deborah Jeane Palfrey, American madam (d. 2008)
  1956   – Ingemar Stenmark, Swedish skier
1957 – Christer Fuglesang, Swedish physicist and astronaut
1958 – Richard de Zoysa, Sri Lankan journalist and author (d. 1990)
1959 – Luc Besson, French director, producer, and screenwriter, founded EuropaCorp
  1959   – Irene Cara, American singer-songwriter and actress (d. 2022)
1960 – Richard Biggs, American actor (d. 2004)
  1960   – Guy Carbonneau, Canadian ice hockey player and coach
  1960   – James Plaskett, Cypriot-English chess player
1961 – Grant Hart, American singer-songwriter and guitarist (d. 2017)
1962 – Michael Andrews, Australian rugby league player
  1962   – Brian Fisher, American baseball player
  1962   – Thomas Ian Griffith, American actor and martial artist 
  1962   – James McMurtry, American singer-songwriter, guitarist, and actor
  1962   – Etsushi Toyokawa, Japanese actor and director
  1962   – Volker Weidler, German race car driver and engineer
1963 – Jeff LaBar, American guitarist (d. 2021)
  1963   – Vanessa L. Williams, American model, actress, and singer
1964 – Bonnie Blair, American speed skater
  1964   – Alex Caffi, Italian race car driver
  1964   – Jo Churchill, British politician
  1964   – Courtney Pine, English saxophonist and clarinet player
  1964   – Isabel Noronha, Mozambican film director
1966 – Jerry Cantrell, American singer-songwriter and guitarist 
  1966   – Peter Jones, English businessman
  1966   – Brian Watts, Canadian golfer
1967 – Miki Berenyi, English singer-songwriter and guitarist 
1968 – Miguel Herrera, Mexican footballer and manager
  1968   – Temur Ketsbaia, Georgian footballer and manager
  1968   – Paul Marsden, English businessman and politician
1969 – Andy Cutting, English accordion player and composer 
  1969   – Vassily Ivanchuk, Ukrainian chess player
  1969   – Shaun Udal, English cricketer
1970 – Queen Latifah, American rapper, producer, and actress
1971 – Wayne Arthurs, Australian tennis player
  1971   – Mike Bell, American wrestler (d. 2008)
  1971   – Mariaan de Swardt, South African-American tennis player, coach, and sportscaster
  1971   – Kitty Ussher, English economist and politician
1972 – Dane Cook, American comedian, actor, director, and producer
  1972   – Reince Priebus, American lawyer and politician
1973 – Luci Christian, American voice actress and screenwriter
1974 – Laure Savasta, French basketball player, coach, and sportscaster
  1974   – Stuart Zender, English bass player, songwriter, and producer 
1975 – Sutton Foster, American actress, singer, and dancer
  1975   – Brian Griese, American football player and sportscaster
  1975   – Kimmo Timonen, Finnish ice hockey player
  1975   – Tomas Žvirgždauskas, Lithuanian footballer
1976 – Giovanna Antonelli, Brazilian actress and producer
  1976   – Tomo Ohka, Japanese baseball player
  1976   – Scott Podsednik, American baseball player
  1976   – Mike Quackenbush, American wrestler, trainer, and author, founded Chikara wrestling promotion
1977 – Zdeno Chára, Slovak ice hockey player
  1977   – Danny Murphy, English international footballer and sportscaster 
  1977   – Fernando Rodney, Dominican-American baseball player
  1977   – Willy Sagnol, French footballer and manager
  1977   – Terrmel Sledge, American baseball player and coach
1978 – Fernandão, Brazilian footballer and manager (d. 2014)
  1978   – Brooke Hanson, Australian swimmer
  1978   – Hu Jun, Chinese actor
  1978   – Brian Scalabrine, American basketball player, coach, and sportscaster
  1978   – Jonas Wallerstedt, Swedish footballer, coach, and manager
1979 – Adam Levine, American singer-songwriter, guitarist, and television personality
1980 – Sébastien Frey, French footballer
  1980   – Sophia Myles, English actress
  1980   – Alexei Yagudin, Russian figure skater
1981 – Tora Berger, Norwegian biathlete
  1981   – Fabian Cancellara, Swiss cyclist
  1981   – Leslie Djhone, French sprinter
  1981   – Jang Na-ra, South Korean singer and actress
  1981   – Kasib Powell, American basketball player
  1981   – Tom Starke, German footballer
  1981   – Doug Warren, American soccer player
  1981   – Lovro Zovko, Croatian tennis player
1982 – Mantorras, Angolan footballer
  1982   – Chad Cordero, American baseball player
  1982   – Timo Glock, German race car driver
  1982   – Adam Pally, American actor, director, producer, and screenwriter
1983 – Ethan Carter III, American wrestler
  1983   – Stéphanie Cohen-Aloro, French tennis player
  1983   – Andy Sonnanstine, American baseball player
  1983   – Tomasz Stolpa, Polish footballer
1984 – Simone Padoin, Italian footballer
  1984   – Rajeev Ram, American tennis player
  1984   – Vonzell Solomon, American singer and actress
1985 – Ana Beatriz, Brazilian race car driver
  1985   – Marvin Humes, English singer 
  1985   – Vince Lia, Australian footballer
1986 – Lykke Li, Swedish singer-songwriter
  1986   – Abdennour Chérif El-Ouazzani, Algerian footballer
1987 – Rebecca Soni, American swimmer
1989 – Francesco Checcucci, Italian footballer
  1989   – Lily Collins, English-American actress
  1989   – Shreevats Goswami, Indian cricketer
  1989   – Kana Nishino, Japanese singer-songwriter
  1989   – Paul Marc Rousseau, Canadian guitarist and producer 
  1989   – Ming Xi, Chinese model
1991 – Dylan Mattingly, American singer-songwriter and guitarist
  1991   – J. T. Realmuto, American baseball player
  1991   – Sam Williams, Australian rugby league player
1992 – Ryan Truex, American race car driver
  1992   – Takuya Terada, Japanese singer, actor, and model
1993 – Solo Sikoa, American wrestler
1995 – Irina Bara, Romanian tennis player
1997 – Ciara Bravo, American actress
  1997   – Rieko Ioane, New Zealand rugby union player

Deaths

Pre-1600
 978 – Edward the Martyr, English king (b. 962)
1076 – Ermengarde of Anjou, Duchess of Burgundy (b. 1018)
1086 – Anselm of Lucca, Italian bishop (b. 1036)
1227 – Pope Honorius III (b. 1148)
1272 – John FitzAlan, 7th Earl of Arundel (b. 1246)
1308 – Yuri I of Galicia
1314 – Jacques de Molay, Frankish knight (b. 1244)
  1314   – Geoffroy de Charney, Preceptor of Normandy for the Knights Templar
1321 – Matthew III Csák, Hungarian oligarch (b. c.1260/5)
1582 – Juan Jauregui, attempted assassin of William I of Orange (b. 1562)

1601–1900
1675 – Arthur Chichester, 1st Earl of Donegall, Irish soldier (b. 1606)
1689 – John Dixwell, English soldier and politician (b. 1607)
1703 – Maria de Dominici, Maltese sculptor and painter (b. 1645)
1745 – Robert Walpole, English politician, Prime Minister of the United Kingdom (b. 1676)
1768 – Laurence Sterne, Irish novelist and clergyman (b. 1713)
1781 – Anne Robert Jacques Turgot, French economist and politician, Controller-General of Finances (b. 1727)
1823 – Jean-Baptiste Bréval, French cellist and composer (b. 1753)
1835 – Christian Günther von Bernstorff, Danish-Prussian politician and diplomat (b. 1769)
1845 – Johnny Appleseed, American gardener and missionary (b. 1774)
1871 – Augustus De Morgan, Indian-English mathematician and academic (b. 1806)
1898 – Matilda Joslyn Gage, American author and activist (b. 1826)
1900 – Hjalmar Kiærskou, Danish botanist (b. 1835)

1901–present
1907 – Marcellin Berthelot, French chemist and politician, French Minister of Foreign Affairs (b. 1827)
1913 – George I of Greece (b. 1845)
1918 – Henry Janeway Hardenbergh, American architect, designed the Plaza Hotel (b. 1847)
1930 – Jean Leon Gerome Ferris, American painter (b. 1863)
1936 – Eleftherios Venizelos, Greek journalist, lawyer, and politician, 93rd Prime Minister of Greece (b. 1864)
1939 – Henry Simpson Lunn, English businessman, founded Lunn Poly (b. 1859)
1941 – Henri Cornet, French cyclist (b. 1884)
1947 – William C. Durant, American businessman, co-founded General Motors and Chevrolet (b. 1861)
  1954   – Walter Mead, English cricketer (b. 1868)
1956 – Louis Bromfield, American environmentalist and author (b. 1896)
1962 – Walter W. Bacon, American accountant and politician, 60th Governor of Delaware (b. 1880)
1964 – Sigfrid Edström, Swedish businessman, 4th President of the International Olympic Committee (b. 1870)
1965 – Farouk of Egypt (b. 1920)
1973 – Johannes Aavik, Estonian philologist and poet (b. 1880)
1977 – Marien Ngouabi, Congolese politician, President of the Republic of the Congo (b. 1938)
  1977   – Carlos Pace, Brazilian race car driver (b. 1944)
1978 – Leigh Brackett, American author and screenwriter (b. 1915)
  1978   – Peggy Wood, American actress (b. 1892)
1980 – Erich Fromm, German psychologist and philosopher (b. 1900)
1982 – Patrick Smith, Irish farmer and politician, Minister for Agriculture, Food and the Marine (b. 1901)
1983 – Umberto II of Italy (b. 1904)
1984 – Charley Lau, American baseball player and coach (b. 1933)
1986 – Bernard Malamud, American novelist and short story writer (b. 1914)
1988 – Billy Butterfield, American trumpet player and cornet player (b. 1917)
1990 – Robin Harris, American comedian (b. 1953)
1993 – Kenneth E. Boulding, English-American economist and activist (b. 1910)
1996 – Odysseas Elytis, Greek poet and critic, Nobel Prize laureate (b. 1911)
2000 – Eberhard Bethge, German theologian and academic (b. 1909)
2001 – John Phillips, American singer-songwriter and guitarist (b. 1935)
2002 – R. A. Lafferty, American soldier and author (b. 1914)
2003 – Karl Kling, German race car driver (b. 1910)
  2003   – Adam Osborne, Thai-English engineer and businessman, founded the Osborne Computer Corporation (b. 1939)
2004 – Harrison McCain, Canadian businessman, co-founded McCain Foods (b. 1927)
2006 – Dan Gibson, Canadian photographer and cinematographer (b. 1922)
2007 – Bob Woolmer, Indian-English cricketer, coach, and sportscaster (b. 1948)
2008 – Anthony Minghella, English director and screenwriter (b. 1954)
2009 – Omid Reza Mir Sayafi, Iranian journalist and blogger (b. 1980)
  2009   – Natasha Richardson, English-American actress (b. 1963)
2010 – Fess Parker, American actor and businessman (b. 1924)
2011 – Warren Christopher, American lawyer and politician, 63rd United States Secretary of State (b. 1925)
2012 – Furman Bisher, American journalist and author (b. 1918)
  2012   – William R. Charette, American soldier, Medal of Honor recipient (b. 1932)
  2012   – William G. Moore Jr., American general (b. 1920)
  2012   – George Tupou V of Tonga (b. 1948)
2013 – Muhammad Mahmood Alam, Pakistani general and pilot (b. 1935)
  2013   – Henry Bromell, American novelist, screenwriter, and director (b. 1947)
  2013   – Clay Ford, American lawyer and politician (b. 1938)
2014 – Catherine Obianuju Acholonu, Nigerian author, playwright, and academic (b. 1951)
  2014   – Kaiser Kalambo, Zambian footballer, coach, and manager (b. 1953)
  2014   – Lucius Shepard, American author and critic (b. 1943)
2015 – Zhao Dayu, Chinese footballer and manager (b. 1961)
  2015   – Thomas Hopko, American priest and theologian (b. 1939)
  2015   – Grace Ogot, Kenyan nurse, journalist, and politician (b. 1930)
2016 – Barry Hines, English author and screenwriter (b. 1939)
  2016   – Jan Němec, Czech director and screenwriter (b. 1936)
  2016   – Tray Walker, American football player (b. 1992)
  2016   – Guido Westerwelle, German lawyer and politician, 15th Vice-Chancellor of Germany (b. 1961)
2017 – Chuck Berry, American guitarist, singer and songwriter (b. 1926)
2020 – Alfred Worden, American test pilot, engineer and astronaut (b. 1932)

Holidays and observances
 Anniversary of the Oil Expropriation (Mexico)
 Christian feast day:
 Alexander of Jerusalem
 Anselm of Lucca
 Cyril of Jerusalem
 Edward the Martyr
 Fridianus
 Salvator
 March 18 (Eastern Orthodox liturgics)
 Flag Day (Aruba)
 Gallipoli Memorial Day (Turkey)
 Men's and Soldiers' Day (Mongolia)
 National Day in Remembrance of COVID-19 Victims (Italy)
 Ordnance Factories' Day (India)
 Sheelah's Day (Ireland, Canada, Australia)
 Teacher's Day (Syria)

References

External links

 BBC: On This Day
 
 Historical Events on March 18

Days of the year
March